Moshe Soloveichik (1879 in Valozhyn – January 31, 1941) was an Orthodox rabbi. He was the eldest son of renowned Rabbi Chaim Soloveitchik and grandson of the Beis HaLevi. He married Pesya Feinstein, daughter of the renowned Rabbi of Pruzany, Rabbi Eliyahu Feinstein, and first cousins with Rabbi Moshe Feinstein.

At the age of 31, he was appointed rabbi of the town of Raseiniai, a position he held for three years. He also was the dean of a yeshiva in the town that Rabbi Nosson Tzvi Finkel of Slabodka was instrumental in founding. In 1913, he took the position of rabbi of Khislavichi. After World War I, he went to Poland in 1920, and served as the director of Talmud studies at Tachkemoni Rabbinical Seminary in Warsaw. From there he immigrated to New York in 1929, answering the call of Rabbi Dr. Bernard Revel to join the faculty as a Rosh Yeshiva at the Rabbi Isaac Elchanan Theological Seminary of Yeshiva University.

While Soloveichik was in New York City, his eldest son, Rabbi Yosef Dov was working on his PhD in philosophy at the University of Berlin, which he completed in 1931. The following year, Yosef Dov (often referred to by his students as "The Rav" or Rav Yoshe Ber) moved to Boston and became head of the Orthodox Jewish community there.

When Soloveichik died in 1941 at the age of 62, Yosef Dov was asked to fill his father's place.

His funeral at RIETS was attended by more than 4,000 mourners and he was eulogized by Rabbi Moshe Rosen on behalf of the Union of Orthodox Rabbis as well as his wife's cousin Moshe Feinstein and other important rabbinic leaders.

Soloveichik's two younger sons were Rabbi Ahron Soloveichik (1917–2001), who also taught at RIETS, and Dr. Samuel Soloveichik (1909–1967) who taught chemistry at Yeshiva College. He also had two daughters: Shulamit Soloveitchik Meiselman (1912–2009), and Dr. Anne Soloveitchik Gerber (1913-2011).

Students

In Europe
Rabbi Yehuda David Goldman
Rabbi Dovid Leibowitz

In America
Rabbi Jacob B. Agus
Rabbi Abraham Avrutick
Rabbi Moshe Zvi Aryeh Bick
Rabbi Sam Genauer
Rabbi Mordechai Gifter
Rabb Bernard Lander
Rabbi Mordechai Kirshblum
Rabbi Sydney Kleiman
Rabbi Dr. Moses Mescheloff
Rabbi Moshe Horowitz

Rabbi Avigdor Miller
Rabbi Emanuel Rackman
Rabbi Chaim Pinchas Scheinberg
Rabbi Yisroel Shurin
Rabbi Yehuda Davis
Rabbi Melech Schachter

Rabbi Nosson Meir Wachtfogel
Rabbi A. Joseph Weiss
Rabbi Louis (Eliezer) Werfel
Rabbi Chaim Zimmerman

Brisk family tree

See also
 Brisk yeshivas and methods

Publications
  HaPardes, No. 14 Vol. 2 1940 May: לכבוד חג הסמיכה (Address To Rabbinic Graduates)
  HaNe'eman, Vol. 28 No. 53 Elul 5739 (1939): בדין רודף והבא במחתרת

External links and references

  geocities
 bartleby
 jewishvirtuallibrary
 "The Rav: The World of Rabbi Joseph B. Soloveitchik" By Rabbi Dr. Aaron Rakeffet-Rothkoff ( & )
https://mishpacha.com/a-shtikel-brisk-on-the-hudson/
  

Specific

1879 births
1941 deaths
People from Valozhyn
People from Oshmyansky Uyezd
Belarusian Orthodox rabbis
Polish emigrants to the United States
American Orthodox Jews
American Orthodox rabbis
American people of Belarusian-Jewish descent
Soloveitchik rabbinic dynasty
Yeshiva University rosh yeshivas
Maimonides scholars